Rodgers Cove is a settlement located northeast of Lewisporte. The first postmistress in 1966 was Phyllis Ludlow.

See also
List of communities in Newfoundland and Labrador
List of people of Newfoundland and Labrador

Populated coastal places in Canada
Populated places in Newfoundland and Labrador